Ved Parkash Mehta (21 March 19349 January 2021) was an Indian-born writer who lived and worked mainly in the United States. Blind from an early age, Mehta is best known for an autobiography published in instalments from 1972 to 2004. He wrote for The New Yorker for many years.

Early life and education
Mehta was born on 21 March 1934 in Lahore, British India (now in Pakistan) to a Punjabi Hindu family. His parents were  Shanti (Mehra) Mehta and Amolak Ram Mehta (1894–1986), a senior public health official in the government of India.

Ved lost his sight at the age of three due to cerebrospinal meningitis. Beginning around 1949, he attended the Arkansas School for the Blind.

Mehta received a BA from Pomona College in 1956; a BA from Balliol College, Oxford, in 1959, where he read modern history; and an MA from Harvard University in 1961. While at Pomona, as very few books were available in Braille, Mehta used student readers, one of whom was Eugene Rose, who went on to become the Russian Orthodox hieromonk Seraphim Rose. Mehta referred to him in two books, one of which was Stolen Light, his second book of memoirs: "I felt very lucky to have found Gene as a reader. ... He read with such clarity that I almost had the illusion that he was explaining things."

Literary career 
His first book, an autobiography called Face to Face, which placed his early life in the context of Indian politics, history and Anglo-Indian relations, was published in 1957; its narrative ends around the time Mehta enrolled at Pomona. Mehta published his first novel, Delinquent Chacha, in 1966. It was serialized in The New Yorker. He subsequently wrote more than 24 books, including several that deal with the subject of blindness, as well as hundreds of articles and short stories, for British, Indian and American publications. He was a staff writer at The New Yorker from 1961 to 1994.

A 1982 profile, published after Mehta was announced as a MacArthur Fellow, stated that he had "gained critical note as a weaver of profiles, as an interviewer who can interpret character and context in the exchange of words with a subject. He is scholarly and journalistic and, above all, a man who thinks things out." In 1989, Spy published a critical article about his misogynist attitude toward his assistants and writings that were frequently regarded as dull and self-indulgent. He left the magazine after, as he claimed, he was "terminated" by editor Tina Brown.

One of the articles he wrote for The New Yorker in 1961 consisted of interviews with Oxford philosophers. A volume of the letters of one of those philosophers, Isaiah Berlin, contains an honest response to Mehta's inquiry about the reactions of his subjects: "You ask me what the reactions of my colleagues are to your piece on Oxford Philosophy... [T]hose to whom I have spoken are in various degrees outraged or indignant ... The New Yorker is a satirical magazine, and I assume from the start that a satire was intended and not an accurate representation of the truth. In any case, only a serious student of philosophy could attempt to do that."  The article was published as a book, now including other public intellectuals, as Fly and the Fly-Bottle: Encounters with British Intellectuals (1962).

Mehta's autobiography, titled Continents of Exile, was published in 12 instalments between 1972 and 2004. Its first volume, Daddyji (1972), is part autobiography and part biography of Mehta's father. Mehta became an American citizen in 1975.

Personal life
In 1983 he married Linn Fenimore Cooper Cary, the daughter of William Lucius Cary and Katherine Lemoine Fenimore Cary; his wife's mother was a descendant of James Fenimore Cooper and the niece of Mehta's former New Yorker colleague, Henry Sage Fenimore Cooper, Jr.

A 1978 profile by Madhur Jaffrey wrote that Mehta regarded himself as "part Indian", "part English", "part American", and as an "expatriate".

Mehta died on 9 January 2021, with complications from Parkinson's disease.

Publications

Continents of Exile 

 
 Mamaji. 1979.
 Vedi. 1982.
 The Ledge Between the Streams. 1984.
 Sound-Shadows of the New World. 1986.
 The Stolen Light. 1989.
 Up at Oxford. 1993.
 Haunted at Harvard. 2007 (written c. 1991).
 Remembering Mr. Shawn's New Yorker: The Invisible Art of Editing. 1998.
 
 Dark Harbor: Building House and Home on an Enchanted Island. 2003.
 The Red Letters: My Father's Enchanted Period. 2004.

Other books 

The Photographs of Chachaji

Three Stories of the Raj
Rajiv Gandhi and Rama's Kingdom

Awards and honours
Mehta received Guggenheim Fellowships in 1971 and 1977. He was named a MacArthur Fellow in 1982, and was elected a fellow of the Royal Society of Literature in 2009. He received honorary degrees from Pomona College, Bard College, Williams College, the University of Stirling, and Bowdoin College.

In Popular Culture
The 2021 American anthology comedy film The French Dispatch by director Wes Anderson mentioned Ved Mehta as one of the inspirations for his film, among other writers & editors of The New Yorker in the film's final credit rolling scene.

See also
 Indians in the New York City metropolitan region
 New Yorkers in journalism

References

Sources

External links

1934 births
2021 deaths
20th-century Indian novelists
20th-century Indian male writers
Alumni of Balliol College, Oxford
Indian blind people
Blind writers
Fellows of the Royal Society of Literature
Harvard University alumni
Indian autobiographers
Indian emigrants to the United States
Indian male novelists
MacArthur Fellows
Pomona College alumni
The New Yorker people
Writers from Lahore

American people of Punjabi descent